Club Sportivo San Lorenzo, is a Paraguayan football club based in the city of San Lorenzo, affiliated to the Paraguayan Football Association. The club was founded April 17, 1930 and plays in the Paraguayan División Intermedia after suffering relegation in the 2020 Paraguayan Primera División season.

Their home games are played at the Estadio Gunther Vogel, which has a capacity of approximately 5,000 seats.

History
The club was founded on April 17, 1930 originally named Tacuary Sport. During November the same year, the club changed its name to Sportivo Villa Cálcena.

After Chaco War on 16 August 1936, the club's name was changed to "Sportivo San Lorenzo".

Joined to Paraguayan Football Association in 1949, the club's first year in a Paraguayan Football Association competition, won the Paraguayan Second Division and were promoted to the Paraguayan First Division for the first time in their history.

The club again won the second division several years 1953, 1960, 1984, 1987, 1994.

The club was relegated to the Third Division in 2004 for the first time in their history.

In 2009 won the Third Division and was promoted to the Paraguayan Second Division.

Sportivo San Lorenzo become the champions of the 2014 Second Division Championship and gets the promotion to the First Division, highest category of Paraguayan football after an 11-year absence.

In 2015 the club was relegated to Second Division.

In 2016 the club was relegated to Third Division.

In 2017 the club become the champions of Third Division and was promoted to Second Division.

In 2018 the club took second place of Second Division and was promoted to First Division.

Honours
Second Division: 7
1949, 1953, 1960, 1984, 1987, 1994, 2014

Third Division: 2
2009, 2017

League Division timeline

Performance in CONMEBOL competitions
Copa CONMEBOL: 1 appearance
1999: First Round

Current roster
As of March 2021.

Notable players
To appear in this section a player must have either:
 Played at least 125 games for the club.
 Set a club record or won an individual award while at the club.
 Been part of a national team at any time.
 Played in the first division of any other football association (outside of Paraguay).
 Played in a continental and/or intercontinental competition.

1980's
 Secundino Aifuch (1983–84, 1986)
1990's
 Pedro Benítez (1998–1999)
  Osvaldo Mendoza (1998-2001)
2000's
 Edgar Robles (2000, 2013)
 Fabio Escobar (2002)
 Cristian Riveros (2005)
 Sílvio Escobar (2007)
 Víctor Aquino (2007)
2010's
 Glacinei Martins (2010–2011)
 Mudo Valdez (2016–2019)
Non-CONMEBOL players
 Bryan Lopez (2014)
 Vincent Ramaël (2016)

References

External links
Sportivo San Lorenzo Info

San Lorenzo
Association football clubs established in 1930
1930 establishments in Paraguay